Cheilotoma is a genus of beetles in the subfamily Cryptocephalinae of the leaf beetles family.

List of species
Eight species are included in the genus, divided into two subgenera:
 Subgenus Cheilotoma Chevrolat in Dejean, 1836
 Cheilotoma beldei Kasap, 1984
 Cheilotoma cankiriensis Özdikmen & Bal, 2016
 Cheilotoma erythrostoma Faldermann, 1837
 Cheilotoma fulvicollis Sahlberg, 1913
 Cheilotoma musciformis (Goeze, 1777)
 Cheilotoma rotroui Kocher, 1961
 Cheilotoma voriseki Medvedev et Kantner, 2003
 Subgenus Exaesiognatha Jacobson, 1923
 Cheilotoma ivanovi Jacobson, 1923

References

External links
Wydział Nauk Biologicznych

Clytrini
Taxa named by Louis Alexandre Auguste Chevrolat
Chrysomelidae genera